Virsa Systems was a California-based compliance software maker. It now forms the Governance, Risk Management, and Compliance (GRC) vertical of SAP Labs.

History

Virsa Systems was founded by Jasvir Gill, a software engineer based in Silicon Valley.  The Virsa tool was substantially based on a tool developed by PricewaterhouseCoopers, known as SAFE, which was purchased by Virsa in December 2004. The SAFE tool was a preventative, automated tool developed to control the granting and management of access within SAP.

On 3 April 2006, SAP AG announced its decision to acquire Virsa Systems. According to the press release, the acquisition was a part of its creation of a new business unit to provide customers with end-to-end solutions for GRC.

See also
Risk management

Footnotes

Companies based in Fremont, California
Software companies based in the San Francisco Bay Area
Defunct software companies of the United States